Geraldine Bey de Haas (born 1935) is an American jazz singer and concert organizer.

Bey performed with the vocal trio Andy and the Bey Sisters with brother Andy Bey and sister Salome Bey in the 1960s. Then she married Eddie de Haas, with whom she settled in Chicago in 1968. In 1974, she created the Duke Ellington Celebration in Grant Park there, from which the Chicago Jazz Festival developed. She also organized other concerts and performance opportunities for young musicians and founded the jazz festival at the South Shore Cultural Center in 1981. Between 1959 and 1965, she was involved in seven recordings.

With de Haas, she has two children, Aisha and Darius, both singers; Darius has also performed on Broadway musicals.

Discography 
 Andy and the Bey Sisters Now! Hear! (Prestige, 1964) with Jerome Richardson, Kenny Burrell 
 Andy and the Bey Sisters Round Midnight (Prestige, 1965) with Kenny Burrell, Milt Hinton, Osie Johnson
 Frank D’Rone and Geraldine DeHaas with Bob Perna and Persistance Finally Together (Nor-AM 1996)

References

External links 
 

1935 births
Living people
Musicians from Newark, New Jersey
20th-century African-American women singers
American women jazz singers
American jazz singers
Prestige Records artists
21st-century African-American people
21st-century African-American women